The Division of the North was a Spanish infantry division that existed in 1808.

Spain was, at that time, an ally of France and the division, composed of 15,000 men under the command of the Marquis de la Romana, Pedro Caro y Sureda, was initially deployed, between 1807 and 1808, to perform garrison duties in Hamburg under Marshal Bernadotte. In March 1808, along with a Franco-Belgian unit of approximately the same size, the unit was deployed to Denmark, with the two-fold objective of protecting that country, also an ally of Napoleon, and preparing for an invasion of Sweden.

Return to Spain

While the Division was in Denmark, the Peninsular War broke out on 2 May 1808. Once Caro y Sureda learned of the changed situation, he made plans with the British to return the Division to Spain. The Marquis contacted Rear-Admiral Keats in his flagship , and on 9 August 1808 the Spaniards seized the fort and town of Nyborg. Keats' squadron then took possession of the port and organized the transportation of the Spanish back to their home country. Some 9-12,000 men of the 15,000-strong division were immediately able to board British ships on 27 August and ultimately escape to Spain. Their defection reduced Bernadotte's "Hanseatic Army" to a string of glorified coastal garrisons, severely sapping Napoleon's left (north) wing in the contest with Austria for mastery over Central Europe in 1809.

Romana and his men arrived at Santander, Spain, where he was appointed Commander of the Galician Armada. The Division reinforced Lieutenant-General Joaquín Blake, whose Army of Galicia was in retreat from superior French armies in Cantabria. At the Battle of Valmaseda, which took place on 5 November 1808, Blake suddenly turned on his pursuers to rescue a trapped detachment and defeated a division of General Victor's army at Valmaseda (Biscay).

The Division then participated in the Battle of Espinosa, fought on 10 and 11 November at the township of Espinosa de los Monteros in the Cantabrian Mountains. The battle resulted in General Victor defeating Blake. Blake, to his credit, led his remaining men through an heroic retreat west through the mountains, escaping Soult's pursuit. However, when he arrived at León on 23 November, only 10,000 men remained under his banner.

See also
Army of Spain (Peninsular War)

Notes

References
Chandler, David G.  The Campaigns of Napoleon. New York: Simon & Schuster, 1995. 

Gates, David. The Spanish Ulcer: A History of the Peninsular War. Da Capo Press 2001. 

Military units and formations of Spain
Military units and formations of the Napoleonic Wars
Military units and formations of the Peninsular War
1808 in Denmark